Abwärts ("Downwards") is a German post-punk band from Hamburg. Members FM Einheit and Mark Chung would leave the group in the early 1980s to join West Berlin band Einstürzende Neubauten. 

Their best-known recordings include the single "Computerstaat" ("Computer State") (1980) and the albums Amok Koma (1981) and Der Westen ist einsam ("The West Is Lonely") (1982), the latter in particular being regarded as a classic of West German post-punk.

The group is profiled along with other contemporaries in Jürgen Teipel's 2001 documentary novel Verschwende Deine Jugend.

References

External links

Musical groups established in 1979
Neue Deutsche Welle groups
German rock music groups
Culture in Hamburg
Musical groups from Hamburg
1979 establishments in West Germany